Friendswood Independent School District is a school district based in Friendswood, Texas (USA).

FISD covers the Galveston County portion of the city of Friendswood (the portion south of Clear Creek, which is the majority of the city). A small portion of the district is in Brazoria County.

The Friendswood Independent School District  was established on December 21, 1948.

All of the district's school's mascots are some version of a horse.

In 2009, the school district was rated "exemplary" by the Texas Education Agency.

Schools
 Secondary schools
Friendswood High School
 Friendswood Junior High  School

Primary schools
 Intermediate schools
 Bales Intermediate School
 Windsong Intermediate School
 Elementary schools
 Cline Elementary School
 Westwood Elementary School

References

External links
 

School districts in Galveston County, Texas
School districts in Brazoria County, Texas
School districts established in 1939
1939 establishments in Texas